Stan Fischler (born March 31, 1932) is a historian of hockey and the New York City Subway, as well as a broadcaster, author, and professor.

During his career, Fischler was best known for covering the New York Islanders, New Jersey Devils and New York Rangers on MSG and MSG Plus. He also provided general hockey analysis on MSG, and continues to write columns for the network's website. In 2009, Fischler began hosting a feature, "Five For Fischler", on Hockey Night Live! which lists his Top Five in a random hockey topic. In the 1980s, he was a hockey commentator for The Radio Show on CBC Radio in Canada. He was also a color commentator for the New England Whalers of the WHA in their first two years in 1972–73 and 1973–74.

In addition to broadcasting, Fischler has authored or co-authored almost 100 books on hockey, baseball and even a few on the New York subway system. His books include: The Hockey Encyclopedia, Everybody's Hockey Book, Hockey Chronicle, The New NHL Encyclopedia, Cracked Ice: An Insider's Look at the NHL, and most recently MetroIce: A Century of Hockey in Greater New York, focusing on the Rangers, Islanders and Devils franchises. His most famous subway book is Uptown, Downtown. Fischler contributed to the 2017 documentary Only the Dead Know the Brooklyn Americans; having been a fan of the team as a young child before the team folded, he was one of the few living Americans fans to have witnessed the team firsthand.

On September 18, 2007, Fischler was announced as one of the four recipients of the 2007 Lester Patrick Trophy.

On May 13, 2014, his wife Shirley—a hockey journalist in her own right and Fischler's long-time collaborator on many of his works—died of cancer at the age of 74.

Fischler retired from MSG Networks on air productions at the conclusion of the 2017–2018 NHL season. Afterwards, he moved to Israel so that he could be closer to his son, Simon, and his grandchildren.

On October 26, 2022 the New York Islanders unveiled The Stan Fischler Press Level, dedicating UBS Arena’s press level to Fischler.

References

External links
Stan Fischler Official Bio
Stan Fischler blog
Stan Fischler Books

1932 births
20th-century American Jews
American television reporters and correspondents
Sportswriters from New York (state)
Lester Patrick Trophy recipients
Living people
National Football League announcers
National Hockey League broadcasters
New Jersey Devils announcers
New York Giants announcers
New York Rangers announcers
New York Islanders announcers
People from Brooklyn
World Hockey Association broadcasters
21st-century American Jews